Bob Valentine (born 19 April 1940) is a former international speedway rider from Australia.

Speedway career 
Valentine rode in the top tier of British Speedway from 1970 to 1977, riding for various clubs. He was a finalist at the British Speedway Championship in 1973 and 1974.

References 

Living people
1940 births
Australian speedway riders
Birmingham Brummies riders
Coventry Bees riders
Cradley Heathens riders
Sheffield Tigers riders
Workington Comets riders
Sportspeople from Newcastle, New South Wales
Sportsmen from New South Wales